Chubatoshi Apok Jamir is an Indian politician. He was a Member of Parliament, representing Nagaland in the Rajya Sabha the upper house of India's Parliament as a member of the  Indian National Congress from 1998 to 2004. He also won the 2008 and 2013 elections for the Nagaland Legislative Assembly representing Mokokchung Town constituency.

See also
List of Rajya Sabha members from Nagaland

References

Indian National Congress politicians from Nagaland
Rajya Sabha members from Nagaland
1961 births
Living people